The Amulet of Ogum is a 1974 Brazilian drama film directed by Nelson Pereira dos Santos. It was entered into the 1975 Cannes Film Festival. It was also selected as the Brazilian entry for the Best Foreign Language Film at the 48th Academy Awards, but was not accepted as a nominee.

Cast
 Ney Santanna as Gabriel
 Anecy Rocha as Eneida, Gabriel's Fiancée
 Joffre Soares as Severiano
 Maria Ribeiro as Maria
 Emmanuel Cavalcanti
 Jards Macalé as Firmino
 Erley José
 Francisco Santos
 José Marinho
 Antônio Carlos de Souza Pereira
 Ilya São Paulo

Release
The Amulet of Ogum was distributed in the United States in February 1987 with a 117 minute running time.

See also
 List of submissions to the 48th Academy Awards for Best Foreign Language Film
 List of Brazilian submissions for the Academy Award for Best Foreign Language Film

References

External links

1974 drama films
1974 films
Brazilian drama films
Films directed by Nelson Pereira dos Santos
1970s Portuguese-language films